Eicochrysops damiri is a butterfly in the family Lycaenidae. It is found on the Comoros in the Indian Ocean.

References

Butterflies described in 1995
Eicochrysops